The 2020 Patriot League women's basketball tournament was the postseason women's basketball tournament for the Patriot League which was scheduled to be held from March 7 to March 15 at campus sites of the higher seed. The winner would have earned an automatic bid to the NCAA women's tournament. On March 12, the NCAA announced that the tournament was cancelled due to the coronavirus pandemic.

Seeds
Teams are seeded by conference record, with ties broken in the following order:
 Head-to-head record between the teams involved in the tie
 Record against the highest-seeded team not involved in the tie, going down through the seedings as necessary
 Higher RPI entering the tournament, as published by College Basketball News

American, Bucknell, Holy Cross, BU, and Lehigh received first round byes.

Schedule

Bracket

References

External links
2020 Patriot League Women's Basketball Championship

Tournament
Patriot League women's basketball tournament
Patriot League women's basketball tournament